Bodyrox are an English electro house music duo consisting of Jon Pearn (from Full Intention) and Nick Bridges.

Biography
"Yeah Yeah", Bodyrox's first commercial single, was released in November 2006 on the Eye Industries label, featuring vocals by Luciana. "Yeah Yeah" reached No. 2 on the UK Singles Chart, also charting in a number of other countries including the Netherlands, Finland, Ireland, New Zealand and Australia. "Yeah Yeah" was used during a breakdancing competition in the 2007 Jamie Kennedy film Kickin' It Old Skool.

The follow-up single to "Yeah Yeah" was "What Planet You On?". The music video featured Luciana in space. The song charted lowly across Europe, with the highest position being No. 54 in the UK, and was included in the video game FIFA 2008 and the UK cult film Tormented.

They also began producing tracks under a new moniker, Another Chance, beginning with "Sound of Eden" (2006) on Phonetic Recordings. The track was reworked the following year as "Everytime I See Her (Sound of Eden)" for major-label release on Positiva/EMI.

Since then Bodyrox have gone on to receive several nominations and awards including an Ivor Novello, and nominations two years in a row at the IDMA's in Miami and a MTV VMA nomination.

Further releases such as "Brave New World" and "Shut Your Mouth" were released in 2009.

In 2010, Bodyrox produced the theme tune for the film StreetDance 3D. In 2011, Bodyrox signed their debut album "Bow Wow Wow" to Transmission Records UK.

Discography

Albums
2007: Generationext
2012: Bow Wow Wow

Singles

References

External links
Official website

English house music duos
DJs from London
DJ duos
Electronic dance music duos
Male musical duos
Electro house musicians
Musical groups from London
Musical groups established in 2005
2005 establishments in England